Ramsey is an unincorporated community in Jefferson County, in the U.S. state of Ohio.

History
A post office called Ramsey was established in 1904, and remained in operation until 1928. Besides the post office, Ramsey had a country store.

References

Unincorporated communities in Jefferson County, Ohio
Unincorporated communities in Ohio